European Universities Championships (EUC) are university sports competitions governed by the European University Sports Association (EUSA). There are currently 23 sports in which the championships are organised. Participants in these events are European university teams and individuals.

In 2019 new Championships were created for kickboxing, orienteering, beach handball and water polo.

History
The championships have been organised annually since 2001, and from 2012 onwards, they will be organised on a biannual basis, with European Universities Games being organised in even years as a multi-sport events, and the individual championships being organised in odd years. Under the umbrella of EUSA, the first championships were organised in 2001 under the name of European University Championships. In 2006, the sports events were renamed European Universities Championships, to stress the universities being the participants in the events. In 2012 the first European Universities Games was organised, bringing together 10 sports from the European Universities Championships at the same place at the same time. In 2014 the second European Universities Games was organised in Rotterdam including 10 different sports.

Championships overview

Championships Summary
  

The programme of the European Universities Championships is subject to change and currently includes 23 sports.
 Individual / team sports
 Indoor / outdoor sports
 Combat sports
 Mind sports
 Racquet sports

See also
European Universities Games
World University Championships

References

External links 
 EUSA official website
Championships Overview

 
Student sports competitions
Universities